Senator Ericson or Erickson may refer to:

C.J.A. Ericson, Iowa State Senate
E. W. Ericson (1858–1951), South Dakota State Senate
Edward Charles Ericson (1856–1910), South Dakota State Senate
Doug Ericksen (born 1969), Washington State Senate
Edgar C. Erickson (1896–1989), Massachusetts State Senate
Edwin Erickson (1938–2019), Pennsylvania State Senate
John E. Erickson (Montana politician) (1863–1946), U.S. Senator from Montana
LeRoy Erickson (1926–1997), North Dakota State Senate
Oscar E. Erickson (1884–1945), North Dakota State Senate
Ron Erickson (born 1933), Montana State Senate